The Girl in Room 105 is the eighth novel and the tenth book overall written by the Indian author Chetan Bhagat. The book became a bestseller based on prearranged sales alone. It tells about an IIT coaching class tutor who goes to wish his ex-girlfriend on her birthday and finds her murdered. The rest of the story is his journey where he stands by his ex-girlfriend after her death to find justice. The book also addresses the stereotypes and political issues in India.

The novel opens up with a conversation of the author of the book, Chetan Bhagat with a fellow passenger on a midnight IndiGo flight from Hyderabad to Delhi. After an initial conversation, Chetan agrees to listen to the story of the fellow passenger. Soon after, the fellow passenger starts narrating his story to the author.

Plot 
Keshav is a former IIT student who currently works as a teacher in a JEE tuition center. He hates his job and reaches out through LinkedIn, but fails to find a proper job. He is a part of an orthodox family. His mother is a homemaker and his father is a part of the RSS. He has a love story with a colleague named Zara Lone, who is pursuing her Ph.D. in IIT. Zara is from a Kashmiri Muslim family and their love story ends due to their families, who fight over religious issues. Keshav couldn't come out of it and keeps remembering Zara, who then loves Raghu (Keshav's classmate). Raghu happens to be an intelligent person with a geeky look. Keshav often calls Zara begging her to come back to him, but she never agrees. Saurabh (Keshav's friend) bids Keshav to forget his past love and focus on his future.

On Zara's birthday, Keshav controls his urge to call Zara and wish her at midnight. He and Saurabh drink and fall asleep. Around 3 a.m., he gets text messages from Zara asking him why he didn't wish her this year. Zara goes on and tells him to meet her in her room immediately. Keshav complies and rushes to Zara's room to wish her in person.

As Keshav enters the room, he finds that the room is dark and its utterly silent. Zara is asleep on the bed. He touches her forehead and feels a cold chill. He then switches on the light and sees her dead. He informs Saurabh who suggests they run away from the scene. But Keshav becomes determined to find the killer. He informs the police, Raghu, and Zara's parents. The police arrests the watchman of the hostel, who is missed from the CCTV camera during the time Zara was killed. Although police close the case afterwards, Keshav continues his investigation. Keshav digs deeper, with the help of police Inspector Vikas Rana. He first suspects Prof. Saxena (Zara's Ph.D. guide), who tries to harass Zara. Then, Prof. Saxena is withdrawn as a suspect in Zara's murder case after finding out the truth.

After seeking of new suspects in the murder case, he tries to find Sikander, Zara's stepbrother who happens to be part of a terrorist group in Kashmir. Keshav seeks help from Zara's father and checks her room for clues. He finds a locker with gunpowder, pregnancy kits, and selfies of Sikander with a gun along with Zara who happens to be smiling in the picture. Keshav goes through the clues one by one. He first tries to meet Sikander and asks him about his group called Tehreek. Sikander gets afraid and threatens them with a gun and runs away. They try to reach him out through his mother in Kashmir. Sikander meets them again and tries to explain that he is not the murderer. But with the proper clues, Keshav almost gets convinced that Sikander killed his sister in the fear that Tehreek might be known to the army. The next day Sikander kills himself, telling that his existence would harm Tehreek and convince everyone that he did not kill his sister. After the suicide of Sikander, Keshav realizes he made a mistake by doubting upon him.

He then finds out about the pregnancy kits Zara had in her safe and sees a picture of an army officer (Captain Faiz Khan) in Kashmir with Zara, in her Instagram. After proper investigation, he finds out that the army officer has gifted Zara expensive jewelry and they raid his house in Delhi. They find the same pregnancy kits and check his internet history, which has search histories related to abortion and divorce. They also find gold blocks in his house and get convinced with the theory that he made Zara pregnant and killed her in guilt. They arrange a dinner party to announce the victim and arrest him unknowingly by inviting everyone Zara knew, after the 100th day of her death. Just before Keshav announces the killer, he goes on a little trip to Hyderabad. This is when he realizes that Raghu is the killer. Raghu confesses to have killed Zara. He killed Zara because he found out she had an affair with her childhood friend, Captain Faiz, and was perhaps pregnant with his child; Faiz tells, however, that she wasn't. While they did have an affair, it ended because Faiz was married and Zara didn't want him to leave his wife and kids, and because Zara loved Raghu.

Keshav learns that Raghu had sent the text messages to him on Zara's birthday, and that Zara was already dead. Raghu is arrested by Inspector Rana. The novel ends with Keshav visiting Zara's grave, and Keshav and Saurabh opening a detective agency: "Z Detectives".

Sequel 
The novel was followed by One Arranged Murder which was published on September 28, 2020.

A reference is also made in his new novel 400 days

References

External links 

Official Website

2018 Indian novels
Novels by Chetan Bhagat
Westland Books books